The Law in These Parts (Hebrew: שלטון החוק) is a 2011 Israeli documentary film, written and directed by Ra'anan Alexandrowicz, about the court system operated by the Israel Defense Forces in the West Bank. It won the Best Documentary award at the 2011 Jerusalem Film Festival and the World Cinema Grand Jury Prize in Documentary at the 2012 Sundance Film Festival. At the Hot Docs Canadian International Documentary Festival, The Law in These Parts won the "Special Jury Prize – International Feature".

The documentary is divided into five chapters and reviews the legal history of Israel's occupation of Arab territories.  Alexandrowicz interviews a number of the judges who were responsible for carrying out the orders of military commanders.  Only judges who presided over occupation-related cases are interviewed; as Alexandrowicz noted, “This film is not about the people who broke the law.  It’s about the people who wrote the law.”

See also
The Gatekeepers

References

External links

 Judging the judges - The Economist

Subjectivity and Objectivity in Israel-Palestine - Truthout

2011 films
2010s Hebrew-language films
Israeli documentary films
Documentary films about the Israeli–Palestinian conflict
Documentary films about law
2011 documentary films
Military courts
West Bank
Sundance Film Festival award winners